Aleksandr Sergeyevich Dmitriyev (born in Leningrad on 19 January 1935), PAU, is a Russian conductor of orchestral and choral music and opera. He has been director of the Symphony Orchestra of the Karel Autonomous Republic, and Principal Conductor of the Maly Academic Opera House in Leningrad. Since 1977 he has been Chief Conductor and Artistic director of the Academic Symphony Orchestra of the St. Petersburg Philharmonia.

In 2005, he was awarded the Order of Honour for Merit in the field of Culture and Art by Vladimir Putin.

References 
 Classica.fm Saint Petersburg. Interview with Alexander Dmitriyev 
 Saint Petersburg Encyclopedia. Shostakovich Philharmonics 

1935 births
Living people
21st-century Russian conductors (music)
Russian male conductors (music)
21st-century Russian male musicians